The Ford C. Frick Award is presented annually by the National Baseball Hall of Fame in the United States to a broadcaster for "major contributions to baseball". It is named for Ford C. Frick, former Commissioner of Major League Baseball. Before his career as an executive, Frick was a baseball writer; he gained fame as the ghostwriter for Babe Ruth in the 1920s. The award was created in 1978, and named in tribute to Frick following his death that year.

Though they are sometimes erroneously referred to as "Hall of Famers", honorees are not inducted into the Hall of Fame. Honorees (if living) give a speech at the Hall of Fame during induction weekend, and their names are added to a plaque in the Hall's library.

Selection
Detail on the selection process for the award when it was first established is lacking.

Through , seven candidates were selected by a committee consisting of previous Frick Award winners and broadcast historians and columnists, which also determined the final recipient. Beginning with the  award, the final election committee no longer selected any of the finalists; that became the role of a Hall of Fame research committee.

2014 changes
Other changes in the selection process were also announced for the 2014 award; these changes were similar to those instituted in 2010 for Veterans Committee balloting. From 2014 to 2016, candidates were considered every third year, based on the era in which they made their most significant contributions:

 "High Tide Era": Mid-1980s to present, including the rise of regional cable networks. Individuals from this era were considered for the 2014 award.
 "Living Room Era": Mid-1950s to early 1980s, reflecting the rise of television. Individuals from this era were considered for the 2015 award.
 "Broadcasting Dawn Era": Origin of broadcasting to early 1950s. Individuals from this era were first considered for the 2016 award.

2017 changes
The Hall of Fame announced further changes to the selection process in 2016 that took effect immediately, with the first award affected by these changes being that for 2017. Fan voting was eliminated, and the final ballot was cut from 10 to 8. Candidates were still considered every third year, but in mostly different categories:

 "Current Major League Markets": Broadcasters who made their mark with one or more specific MLB teams. These individuals were first considered for the 2017 award.
 "National Voices": Broadcasters who made their contributions with national media. These individuals were first considered for the 2018 award.
 "Broadcasting Beginnings": Pioneers of baseball broadcasting, roughly covering the time span of the previous "Broadcasting Dawn Era". These individuals were first considered for the 2019 award.

2022 changes
In April 2022, the Hall of Fame announced further changes to the Frick Award selection process. The size of the ballot was restored to 10 nominees, while also requiring that at least one candidate be a foreign-language broadcaster. The election cycle was also revised, effective with the 2023 balloting: four consecutive elections will have a composite ballot of local and national broadcasters, followed by one election for broadcasters whose careers ended prior to 1994 (the introduction of the Wild Card era). Thus, recipients will be selected per the following balloting rotation, which will then repeat: 
 Composite ballot (local and national voices): , 2024, 2025, 2026
 Pre-Wild Card Era ballot: 2027

Veterans Committee participation
For several years in the early 2000s, Frick Award honorees also became life members of the Veterans Committee, which considers candidates for Hall of Fame induction who are not eligible for the regular voting by the Baseball Writers' Association of America – specifically, players no longer on the BBWAA ballot and all non-players. However, starting with the  elections, voting for players on the main Veterans Committee ballot was restricted to Hall of Fame members. After further changes announced for the  elections, Frick Award winners became eligible to serve on the voting bodies that replaced the Veterans Committee that consider candidates from different eras of baseball.

Recipients

Source:

See also

List of current Major League Baseball announcers
List of sports journalism awards
Curt Gowdy Media Award—the NBA's comparable award
Foster Hewitt Memorial Award—the NHL's comparable award
Pete Rozelle Radio-Television Award—the NFL's comparable award
BBWAA Career Excellence Award

Notes

References

Awards established in 1978
 
Major League Baseball trophies and awards
Frick Award
Sportscasting awards
1978 establishments in the United States